Ayman El Yamani (Arabic: أيمن اليماني) is an Egyptian former football player and manager. He last managed Hearts of Oak in the Ghanaian Premier League.

Coaching career

Becoming Hearts of Oak coach in September 2009,  he vowed to build a team comparable to the Hearts side that won the 2000 CAF Champions League.

By beating Asante Kotoko, El Yamani strengthened his position as coach and confuted rumors about to his dismissal. However, he did not have any chemistry with the players and did not have a hand in signing or selling players to help Hearts of Oak. Around two months after his appointment, the Egyptian was relieved of his duties with a record of four defeats, two draws, and five wins in 11 matches and has looked for a Kenyan club.

References

External links
 
 

Year of birth missing (living people)
Living people
Egyptian football managers
Egyptian footballers
Expatriate football managers in Ghana
Zamalek SC players
Expatriate football managers in Eswatini
Association football midfielders
Egyptian expatriate football managers
Egyptian expatriate sportspeople in Ghana
Egyptian expatriate sportspeople in Mozambique
Egyptian expatriate sportspeople in Eswatini
Expatriate football managers in Mozambique